Head Break Solution is a second studio album by the Russian metal band Icon in Me.

Track listing 
 Suicide World - Intro (1:13)
 Wasted Ways (4:45)
 Face It (4:06)
 The Quest (4:49)
 Un-Slaved (4:50)
 Lost for Nothing (4:10)
 Flood Kills (4:29)
 Nuclear Drama (3:48)
 Tired and Broken (4:03)
 Through the Sights (2:45)
 Aspects of the Unknown (4:36)
 Solid Child (3:42)

Bonus tracks 
 Thousand Wars (3:44)
 Dead Salvation (4:44)

Personnel 

Ben Schigel – Mixing
Maor Appelbaum – Mastering

References

External links 
 Review by Metalholic.co 
 Review by LordsOfMetal.nl 
 Review by MusikReviews.de 
 Review by TheNewReview.net

Icon in Me albums
2011 albums